The Leo Magnus Cricket Complex (LMCC) is a group of four cricket grounds located in the Van Nuys neighborhood of Los Angeles, California, United States. The facility is also called Woodley Cricket Field(s) or Woodley Cricket Complex due to its location in Woodley Park. Former Jamaican Test cricketer Franklyn Rose has said of the complex: "It has the best cricket field facilities in the US. There is no comparison."

History

The cricket complex is named after Leo "Jingles" Magnus, a Jamaican cricketer who also played for the University Cricket Club and coached the Los Angeles Krickets, Sheenaway Serendipity Cricket Club and the Compton Cricket Club. It first opened in 1975.

In 1978, the Glendale Equestrian Center took over the Burbank-area Griffith Park Cricket Association grounds, which had been home to L.A. cricket via the Hollywood Cricket Club since 1933. An active West Indian cricket community obtained land in the Sepulveda Basin in 1977 and two fields at Woodley opened in 1980 (named the Clifford Severn and Ernie Wright grounds), with two more added in 1996 (the Jean Wong and John Marder grounds, both named for former Southern California Cricket Association presidents). The complex has a small stand, which can seat 50, and a clubhouse with bathrooms.

In 1997, Woodley hosted the Jamaican team (featuring Jimmy Adams and Franklyn Rose) and in 1999 hosted a List A match between an India A side (with VVS Laxman) against an Australia A side (with Brett Lee, Adam Gilchrist, and Andrew Symonds), which attracted a crowd of 5,000. In the 2000s, Twenty20 cricket became popular and Southern California Cricket Association President Vehman Reddy helped bring the Trinidad and Tobago side and Punjabi Blues to L.A. for three annual tournaments. The complex is frequently used for United States of America Cricket Association trials. The first American College Cricket west-coast regional championship took place at Woodley in 2010. The American Cricket Federation hosted its first Twenty20 tournament at Woodley in 2012.

In 2016 the International Cricket Council (ICC) held the World Cricket League Division Four tournament at the LMCC. This was the first time an ICC WCL divisional event had been played in the USA. The USA won the tournament by beating Oman in the Final and both were promoted to Division Three. Mick Jagger of the Rolling Stones stopped by to watch one of the USA's matches.

References 

 David Sentance, Cricket in America 1710-2000 (McFarland Press 2006).

1980 establishments in California
Cricket grounds in the United States
Sports venues completed in 1980
Sports venues in Los Angeles
Van Nuys, Los Angeles
Cricket in Los Angeles